Vespinitocris camerunica is a species of beetle in the family Cerambycidae. It was described by Stephan von Breuning in 1956. It is known from Cameroon.

References

Endemic fauna of Cameroon
Saperdini
Beetles described in 1956